Ellerton is a village and civil parish in the East Riding of Yorkshire, England.
It lies west of the B1228 road and east of the River Derwent.

Civil parish 
The parish includes Aughton. In 1935 the civil parishes of Ellerton Priory and Aughton were abolished and merged into Ellerton. Although the civil parish is called "Ellerton" its parish council is called "Ellerton & Aughton Parish Council".

History
A priory of canons of the Gilbertine Order existed at Ellerton, which was known as Ellerton Priory. The priory was founded before 1212, and relinquished on 11 December 1536 under the Suppression of the Monasteries. The site of the priory is now a scheduled ancient monument.

In 1823 Ellerton, was in the Wapentake of Harthill, and contained a Methodist chapel and a chapel dedicated to St Mary. The village had a population of 318, with occupations including ten farmers, a corn miller, a tailor, and a shopkeeper. A shoemaker was also a licensed victualler of The Board public house. Also directory-listed was a school master, a gentleman and a vicar. Once a week a carrier operated between the village and York.

The parish church of St Mary, by architect John Loughborough Pearson, was designated a Grade II listed building in December 1966 and is now recorded in the National Heritage List for England, maintained by Historic England.

References

External links

Villages in the East Riding of Yorkshire
Civil parishes in the East Riding of Yorkshire